The Marković affair was a political scandal in France in 1968 that followed a violent death of Stevan Marković, a friend and bodyguard of actor Alain Delon. Marković had sexually-explicit photos of what was believed to be Claude Pompidou, wife of French President Georges Pompidou. The press speculated Delon was involved. Delon's longtime friend François Marcantoni was arrested for a year, being bailed out in 1969. The affair was never solved, having been dismissed in 1973 for lack of evidence. Marković's murder is still unsolved.

In a further development, sexually-explicit photos, allegedly of Claude Pompidou, Pompidou's wife, were found in Marković's car after his death. A former police chief, Lucien Aimé-Blanc, who was involved in obtaining the photos, stated that they had been planted by established Gaullist clans opposed to Pompidou. Their veracity was subsequently challenged.

Life and death of Stevan Marković
Marković was born on 10 May 1937 in Belgrade. In the 1950s, Marković and his friend Milos Milos (Miloš Milošević) were involved in streetfighting in Belgrade. They met Delon, then a young movie star, who was making a film in Belgrade in co-production with Yugoslavian studios. Delon first employed Milos Milos and later Marković as his bodyguard. Marković was a friend with Serbian gangster Nikola Milinković and walked in the first column of the convoy of Nikola's burial.

A heavy gambler who was often suspected of cheating, Marković was known for his high-class parties at which it was alleged he would set up secret cameras throughout the house, especially in the bedrooms. He thus collected many compromising photos of the guests that could have damaged their social status. He approached several newspapers trying to sell them. Surprisingly, some of the photographs would be alleged to be directly targeting Delon and Marcantoni themselves. However, the most important photos that Marković supposedly possessed were scandalous shots of Pompidou's wife. That was a major concern to Pompidou, who was preparing to run for president.

On 1 October 1968, Marković's body was found in a public dump in the village of Élancourt, Yvelines, west of Paris. His murder is still unsolved.

Involvement of Alain Delon and François Marcantoni
It was alleged that Delon became acquainted with "some highly dubious French gangland characters" and was a close friend of François Marcantoni. When Delon's bodyguard Marković mysteriously died, Marcantoni and Delon came under suspicion in part because of a letter written by Marković to his brother, Aleksandar, in which he implicated Alain Delon and François Marcantoni as guilty if any harm came to him.

Marcantoni was initially charged with the murder. However, after he was questioned by the police, the charges were eventually dropped, and the crime remains unsolved.

Involvement of Pompidous
The death of Marković provoked many rumours, many suggesting the existence of group sex photos with Madame Pompidou. Georges Pompidou was then conducting his presidential campaign and wanted to dispel them as soon as possible. He formally told the public that the talk concerning the Marković affair was all rumors. While admitting that he and his wife had attended parties with Marković and Delon, Pompidou accused Louis Wallon and Henri Capitant of using the French espionage service SDECE to frame him.  Some alleged that Pompidou ordered Marković's murder in revenge for the supposed photos of his wife. Even though he claimed the woman in the photos was a prostitute who simply resembled his wife, the rumors initially hurt Pompidou's campaign. After he nevertheless overcame the rumors and won the 1969 election, Pompidou appointed Alexandre de Marenches as the chief of the SDECE with instructions to reform it.

According to some, the Marković affair was merely a ploy to damage Georges Pompidou's reputation by attacking the public image of his wife. Later, information proved that it was not Madame Pompidou in the photos but a prostitute who had been paid by a former police chief, Lucien Aimé-Blanc, with long connections to the SDECE. Aimé-Blanc claimed in his memoirs that an anonymous friend asked him to recruit a blonde-haired prostitute in her forties and who was then used as Madame Pompidou's lookalike so she could be photographed in compromising positions with another woman.

Aftermath
 wrote Les Mystères Delon, a book about Alain Delon, published in 2000. It was the first book in French legal history to have been banned by authorities before it was officially allowed to be sold, allegedly  because Delon, one of the few surviving persons associated with the affair, sought to block its sale. However, the ban was eventually lifted, and the book was sold in France.

References

Political scandals in France
1968 in France
Organized crime events in France
20th-century scandals
Unsolved murders in France
Alain Delon